Jorinde Verwimp (born 10 November 1994) is a Belgian Olympic dressage rider. Representing Belgium, she competed at the 2016 Summer Olympics in Rio de Janeiro where she finished 36th in the individual competition.

Verwimp also competed at the 2015 European Dressage Championships where she achieved 10th place in the team and 17th place in the individual competitions. She won two medals at European young riders championships.

References

Living people
1994 births
Belgian female equestrians
Belgian dressage riders
Equestrians at the 2016 Summer Olympics
Olympic equestrians of Belgium
21st-century Belgian women